Ross Anderson (born 1971) is a FIS World Cup/professional speed skier as well as All American Record Holder speed skier a speed of 154.06 mph.

Background 
Ross Anderson was born on May 8, 1971, in Holloman Air Force Base, New Mexico He is an enrolled member of the Cheyenne and Arapaho Tribes and a Mescalero Apache and Choctaw descendant. He grew up in Durango, Colorado and now lives in Albuquerque, New Mexico.

Skiing career 
He broke the former All American record in 2006 with a speed of 154.06 mph flying past the former record held by John Hemble from Aspen Colorado with a speed of 153.03 mph at Les Arcs France 2006." On April 19, places him 10th in the world all-time rankings.

References

External links
 
 Interview
 FIS-Ski Biography

1971 births
Living people
American people of Apache descent
American people of Muscogee descent
Cheyenne and Arapaho Tribes people
American male alpine skiers
Native American sportspeople
People from Durango, Colorado
Sportspeople from Albuquerque, New Mexico